Prof. Adya Prasad Pandey is an Indian economist and academic. , he is  Former Vice Chancellor of Manipur University. He is having Manipur State Minister Cadre. Prof. Pandey is currently National President of Indian Economic Association ,'One of the Biggest Association of Economist',Prof. Pandey is also Independent Director of National Small Industries Corporation (NSIC) National Small Industries Corporation

Prof. Adya Prasad Pandey is a full-time professor at the Banaras Hindu University.
He is also member of the Executive Council of Banaras Hindu University.

Early life and education
Pandey is a graduate of Banaras Hindu University Varanasi, earning BSc, MBA and MA degrees from the institution. He started his teaching career at the same university during 1979.

He then studied for a PhD degree in Economics, also at Banaras Hindu University, under the supervision of P.K. Bhargava. His PhD subject was the Uttar Pradesh Financial Corporation, and the findings of the PhD were used by that corporation to improve the financial performance of the business.

Professor Pandey was subsequently promoted to Head of the Department of Economics at Banaras Hindu University, and held additional responsibilities at the institution, co-ordinating the National Service Scheme and chairing the university games.
Currently Professor Pandey is Board of Governor of IIT BHU, and Executive Council Member of Prestigious Banaras Hindu University.

References 

Year of birth missing (living people)
Living people
20th-century Indian economists
Academic staff of Banaras Hindu University
Heads of universities and colleges in India